The Productivity and Work Party was a political party in Guatemala.

History
The political party was registered by the Supreme Electoral Tribunal in 2015 with the necessary affiliates. Its general secretary is Edgar Alfredo Rodríguez, Minister of Labor during the government of Álvaro Colom.  It was the political platform of former Finance Minister Juan Alberto Fuentes.

Presidential elections

References

External links

2015 establishments in Guatemala
2020 disestablishments in Guatemala
Centrist parties in North America
Defunct political parties in Guatemala
Political parties established in 2015